Millie Scott is an American R&B singer who had moderate success in the US Billboard R&B chart during the 1980s.

Biography
Scott was born in Savannah on the coast of Georgia. She first sang gospel, before becoming a jazz singer. After moving to New York, she was enticed to move to Detroit by The Temptations, and she remains in Detroit to this day.

In 1971 she formed the group Quiet Elegance along with Lois Reeves and Frankie Gearing. They toured with The Temptations and signed to the Hi Records label in 1972, releasing a number of singles. In 1986, she was signed to D&B Productions in Detroit, helmed by Bruce Nazarian, whose recordings led to Scott being signed as a solo artist to Island Records and releasing her debut single, "Prisoner of Love". It peaked at #52 in the UK Singles Chart in 1986. Follow-up singles "Automatic" and "Ev'ry Little Bit" also charted in the UK.

Scott made numerous appearances on the UK Channel 4 television programme Solid Soul in the mid-1980s, alongside other R&B acts such as Loose Ends and Ruby Turner.

Discography

Studio albums

Singles

References

External links
Album and singles discography at Discogs.

Year of birth missing (living people)
Musicians from Savannah, Georgia
Living people
American contemporary R&B singers
American women singers
21st-century American women